Verna Elizabeth Watre Ingty was an Indian social worker and a former chairman of Meghalaya State Welfare Advisory Board. She was the president of Mothers' Union of Tura. She was honoured by the Government of India in 2003 with Padma Shri, the fourth highest Indian civilian award, making her the first person from Garo tribe to receive the award. Ingty died, aged 72, at Shillong, Meghalaya on 14 January 2004. Her son, P. W. Ingty is an author and an IAS officer.

See also

 Garo people

References

1930s births
2004 deaths
20th-century Indian educational theorists
20th-century Indian women scientists
Bodo-Kachari
Educators from Meghalaya
Social workers
People from Shillong
Recipients of the Padma Shri in social work
Scholars from Meghalaya
Social workers from Meghalaya
Women educators from Meghalaya
Year of birth missing
20th-century women educators